Carbon Point is a headland just northwest of Clapmatch Point, near the southwest corner of Candlemas Island, South Sandwich Islands. The name derives from Punta Carbon used in Argentine hydrographic publications as early as 1953.

References
 

Headlands of South Georgia and the South Sandwich Islands